For the athletics competitions at the 2016 Summer Olympics, the following qualification systems were in place. Qualification ended on 11 July 2016.

Russian disqualification 

Because of the suspension of the Russian Athletics Federation by the IAAF, due to widespread doping violations, Russia currently will not qualify as a team for these Olympics or other international competitions, and unless this suspension is lifted in time, Russia will be unable to send an athletics delegation to these Games. While Russia will continue to seek further appeals, the IAAF confirmed its decision on 18 June 2016 after a report by a five-member task force which reported that Russia had failed to fully address its "deep- culture" of doping. The IAAF did provide for the possibility of accepting individual Russian athletes who have been sufficiently tested outside of the Russian system. One athlete suggested was Yuliya Stepanova for her efforts to expose the scandal.

The IAAF then stated on 24 June, that athletes from Russia seeking "exceptional eligibility for International Competition under Competition Rule 22.1A" will be considered and have the permission to compete, "not for Russia but as a neutral athlete", following guidelines. These athletes have to clearly and convincingly show that they are not co involved in the Russian system (outside the country and subject to other systems). On 1 July 2016, Yuliya Stepanova became the first neutral athlete to be qualified under these rules. Darya Klishina, who lives in the United States, has also been given permission. They will compete as Independent Olympic Athletes. The Court of Arbitration for Sport confirms that verdict and rejects the appeal of 68 Russian athletes, on 21 July 2016. Whistleblower Stepanova was eventually barred from competing by the IOC, and she was called a traitor and received death threats back at home in Russia.

Qualifying standards 
Different from the previous Olympics, a National Olympic Committee (NOC) may enter up to 3 qualified athletes in each individual event if all athletes meet the entry standard during the qualifying period. An NOC may also enter a maximum of 1 qualified relay team per event. NOCs may enter athletes regardless of time (1 athlete per sex) if they have no athletes meeting the entry standard. This makes it possible for every nation to have a minimum of two representatives in the sport.

The qualifying time standards may be obtained in various meets during the given period that have the approval of the IAAF. All approved outdoor meets and indoor meets with the exception of 100 m, 200 m and 110/100 m hurdles races are eligible. The qualifying period for the 10,000 m, marathon, walks, and combined events was from 1 January 2015 to 11 July 2016 and for the remaining events, from 1 May 2015 to 11 July 2016.

For the relays, a maximum of sixteen qualified NOCs shall be entitled to each event. The top eight teams in each event at the 2015 IAAF World Relays (held in Nassau, Bahamas on 2–3 May 2015) guaranteed a spot on their respective NOCs for the Olympics. The remaining half in each event are selected according to IAAF World Ranking List as of 12 July 2016 based on the aggregate of the 2 fastest times achieved by NOCs during the given period.

In addition to the qualifying standards below, marathon runners finishing in the top 20 of the 2015 IAAF World Championships or in the top 10 of any IAAF Gold Label marathon within the qualification period are also treated as having earned the A standard.

The NOCs are still allowed to select athletes using their own rules, on the condition that all of them have made the qualifying time. For example, the United States selects athletes based on the result of the 2016 United States Olympic Trials event, but has a policy of entering every athlete so qualified. Sweden only enters athletes good enough to reach at least the eighth position, based on an assessment by the Swedish NOC.

The IAAF Qualifying Standards are as follows:

Track events

Men's track events

Men's 100 m 
Does not include indoor achievements

As of 10 July 2016

Men's 200 m 
Does not include indoor achievements

As of 19 July 2016

Men's 400 m 

As of 26 June 2016

Men's 800 m 

As of 11 July 2016

Men's 1500 m 

As of 10 June 2016

Men's 5000 m 

As of 10 June 2016

Men's 10,000 m 

As of 10 June 2016

Men's 110 m hurdles 
Do not include indoor achievements

As of 4 August 2016

Men's 400 m hurdles 

As of 18 June 2016

Men's 3000 m steeplechase 

As of 10 June 2016

Women's track events

Women's 100 m 
Does not include indoor achievements

As of 25 June 2016

Women's 200 m 
Does not include indoor achievements

As of 26 June 2016

Women's 400 m 

As of 2 July 2016

Women's 800 m 

As of 10 June 2016

Women's 1500 m 

As of 10 June 2016

Women's 5000 m 

As of 10 June 2016

Women's 10,000 m 

As of 10 June 2016

Women's 100 m hurdles 

As of 10 June 2016

Women's 400 m hurdles 

As of 10 June 2016

Women's 3000 m steeplechase 

As of 10 June 2016

Road events

Men's road events

Men's marathon 

Qualifying for the Kenyan marathon team is the most competitive.  427 Kenyan men achieved the qualification standard.

As of 10 June 2016

Men's 20 km walk 

As of 10 June 2016

Men's 50 km walk 

As of 10 June 2016

Women's road events

Women's marathon 

As of 10 June 2016

Women's 20 km walk 

As of 10 June 2016

Field events

Men's field events

Men's long jump 

As of 6 July 2016

Men's triple jump 

As of 11 July 2016

Men's high jump 

As of 10 June 2016

Men's pole vault 

As of 10 June 2016

Men's shot put 

As of 10 June 2016

Men's discus throw 

As of 10 June 2016

Men's hammer throw 

As of 10 June 2016

Men's javelin throw 

As of 10 June 2016

Women's field events

Women's long jump 

As of 2 July 2016

Women's triple jump 

As of 10 June 2016

Women's high jump 

As of 10 June 2016

Women's pole vault 

As of 10 June 2016

Women's shot put 

As of 10 June 2016

Women's discus throw 

As of 10 June 2016

Women's hammer throw 

As of 10 June 2016

Women's javelin throw 

As of 10 June 2016

Combined events

Men's decathlon 

As of 10 June 2016

Women's heptathlon 

As of 13 July 2016

Relay events 
IAAF Qualified Relay Teams

Men's 4 × 100 m relay

Men's 4 × 400 m relay

Women's 4 × 100 m relay

Women's 4 × 400 m relay

References 

Qualification for the 2016 Summer Olympics
Qualification